Manasyan is an Armenian surname. Notable people with the surname include:

 Klir tstox manasyan (born 1988), Armenian constitutionalist
 Sargis Manasyan, Armenian politician
 Vazgen Manasyan (born 1958), Tajikistani football coach

Armenian-language surnames